form the country's third-largest community of immigrants from a Muslim-majority country, trailing only the Indonesian community and Bangladeshi community. As of June 2022, official statistics showed 20,927 registered foreigners of Pakistani origin living in the country. There were a further estimated 3,414 illegal immigrants from Pakistan in Japan as of 2000. The average increase in the Pakistani population is about 2-3 persons per day.

Migration history
As early as 1950, only three years after the independence of Pakistan in 1947 which created the Pakistani state, there were recorded to be four Pakistanis living in Japan. However, Pakistani migration to Japan would not grow to a large scale until the 1980s. The later Pakistani migrants in Japan largely come from a muhajir background; their family history of migration made them consider working overseas as a "natural choice" when they found opportunities at home to be too limited. While Pakistanis saw North America as a good destination to settle down and start a business, Japanese employment agencies commonly advertised in Karachi newspapers in the 1980s, when Japan offered some of the highest wages in the world for unskilled labour; it came to be preferred as a destination by single male migrants, who came without their families. The wages they earned could reach as high as twenty times what they made in Pakistan.

Pakistani citizens once enjoyed the privilege of short-term visa-free entry to Japan, but when controversy arose in Japanese society over illegal foreign workers, the Japanese government revoked this privilege. With little chance of acquiring a work visa or even permission to enter the country, Pakistanis paid as much as ¥300,000 to people smugglers in the late 1980s and early 1990s to enter the country. According to Japanese government statistics, the number of Pakistanis illegally residing in Japan peaked in 1992 at 8,056 individuals and declined after that. However, Pakistani sources suggest that as late as 1999, the total population of Pakistanis was 25,000 and still included a significant amount of illegal immigrants. Some Pakistanis were able to obtain legal resident status by finding Japanese spouses.

Demographics

According to 2008 Japanese government figures, 19.9% of registered Pakistanis lived in Saitama, 17.8% in Tokyo, 12.3% in Kanagawa, 10.4% in Aichi, 8.98% in Chiba, 7.59% in Gunma, 6.02% in Ibaraki, 4.44% in Tochigi, 4.21% in Toyama, 3.27% in Shizuoka and the remaining 4.98% in other prefectures of Japan. Only an estimated 200 Pakistanis hold Japanese citizenship.

Business and employment
Many Pakistanis in Japan run used car export businesses. This trend was believed to have begun in the late 1970s, when one Pakistani working in Japan sent a car back to his homeland. The potential for doing business in used cars also attracted more Pakistanis to come to Japan in the 1990s.

Though many migrants come from a middle-class family background in Pakistan, because they often work at so-called Dirty, Dangerous and Demeaning (3D/3K) jobs and because of their portrayal in the Japanese media, even their co-workers tended to misperceive their background and level of education.

Religion
Many Japanese wives of Pakistani migrants have converted to Islam and in fact form the largest group of native Japanese converts to Islam. They often send their children to mosques so that they can learn about their ancestral religion and study the Arabic language.

Media
Japan has some Urdu language media aimed at Pakistanis, such as the freely distributed Pak Shimbun, as well as other Japanese-language publications targeted towards Muslims at large.

Notable people
 Hussain Shah, professional boxer, represented Pakistan in 1988 Seoul Olympics & won a Bronze medal, moved to Japan to become a boxing coach afterwards.
 Shah Hussain Shah, son of Hussain Shah, judoka, represented Pakistan at Rio Olympics in 2016
 Farrukh Amil, PhD in Law & Diplomacy, Ambassador of Pakistan in Japan since 2012

References

Notes

Sources
 
 
 

Further reading
 Kudo, Masako. "Constructing "Home" across National Boundaries: A Case of Pakistani-Japanese Marriage" (Part II: International Migration and Marriage: Chapter 7). In: Zhang, Jijiao and Howard Duncan. Migration in China and Asia: Experience and Policy (Volume 10 of International Perspectives on Migration). Springer Science & Business Media, April 8, 2014. , 9789401787598. Start p. 103.
 
 A draft research paper in English by the same author covering similar material was also presented the previous year:

External links
 Pakistan Association Japan
 Pakistan Student Association Japan
 Pakistan Japan News
 Pakistan Japan TV
 Monbukagakusho Alumni Association of Pakistan

 
Ethnic groups in Japan
Japan